Allocasuarina rigida is a species of the genus Allocasuarina native to Australia.

It is found on volcanic outcrops in exposed situations in north eastern New South Wales and south eastern Queensland.

References

External links
  Occurrence data for Allocasuarina rigida from The Australasian Virtual Herbarium

rigida
Fagales of Australia
Flora of New South Wales
Flora of Queensland
Dioecious plants